The Edwin Upton Curtis Memorial is a memorial commemorating Edwin Upton Curtis, installed along Boston's Charles River Esplanade, in the U.S. state of Massachusetts. The memorial features two large urns, and was originally installed near Clarendon Street during 1923–1924 before being relocation to their current position near the Hatch Shell.

References

External links
 
 Dedication of the Edwin U. Curtis Memorial, Charles River Esplanade, May 6, 1924, Tufts University

Charles River Esplanade
Monuments and memorials in Boston
Outdoor sculptures in Boston